This is a list of the U.S. Billboard magazine Mainstream Top 40 number-one songs of 2003.

During 2003, a total of 16 singles hit number-one on the charts.

Chart history

See also
2003 in music

Billboard charts
United States Mainstream Top 40
Mainstream Top 40 2003